Kim McNeill is an American basketball coach from Bassett, Virginia. She is the current head coach for the East Carolina Pirates women's basketball team. Prior to becoming the head coach at East Carolina in 2019, she spent three seasons as the head women's basketball coach for the University of Hartford. Before taking over at Hartford she served as assistant and associate head coach at Virginia.

Playing career 
McNeill (at the time, Kim Hairston) began her collegiate playing career at Radford. As a freshman, she won the award as the Big South rookie of the year. She hit 45 out of 112 three point attempts for a 40.2% completion rate, which represented the second-highest figure and program history at that time. She then transferred to Richmond, where she was a co-captain of her team, and made the Colonial Athletic Association All-defensive team as a senior.

Coaching career 
McNeill worked as an assistant coach for three of her first four years after playing at James Madison. The one exception was a one-year stint at Howard. The last two years at James Madison she worked under Kenny Brooks, first when he was an associate head coach, and then when he was head coach.

She then returned to her alma mater, Richmond, in 2004, as an assistant coach, for a year. Joanne Boyle was the head coach of Richmond at the time. When Boyle accepted the head coaching position for California The following year, McNeill went with her to be an assistant on her staff.

After two years at California, during which the team went 41 – 21 over the two years and achieve the program's first winning seasons in 13 years, She took a position as an assistant coach with Hall of Fame coach Andy Landers at Georgia.

She spent four years at Georgia until Joanne Boyle took the head coaching position at Virginia and McNeill joined her as an assistant coach for two years and then was named associate head coach for three years. During her five years at Virginia the Cavaliers were 90–71, which included the first 25 win season in over a decade and three WNIT appearances.

Hartford
McNeill took to step up to head-coaching when Jennifer Rizzotti left Hartford after 17 years as head coach. In her first year, she led the Hawks to a 17–14 season. All 59 wins at the University of Hartford were vacated by the NCAA.

2017–18
In her second season at Hartford she led the Hawks to the America East Championship game falling to Maine 74-65.

2018–19
In her final season as head coach she led Hartford to a second-place finish in the America East and an invitation to the WNIT in 2019, losing to Providence in the first round 71–54.

East Carolina
In March 2019, East Carolina Persuaded McNeill to take over as head coach.

Head coaching record

References

External links
 Official Biography, East Carolina Pirates

Living people
American women's basketball coaches
Basketball coaches from Virginia
California Golden Bears women's basketball coaches
Georgia Lady Bulldogs basketball coaches
Hartford Hawks women's basketball coaches
Howard Bison women's basketball coaches
James Madison Dukes women's basketball coaches
People from Bassett, Virginia
Richmond Spiders women's basketball coaches
Virginia Cavaliers women's basketball coaches
1978 births